The Bourne Rural District Council was established in 1894 and existed until 1931, when it was abolished and replaced with the South Kesteven Rural District Council. Councillors were elected to serve on it for three-year terms. The first elections took place in December 1894. There were 43 seats on the council. All divisions returned one member, except where stated below. No members were returned for three seats, leaving only 39 councillors in place for the RDC's first meeting on 3 January 1895.

Results 
The full list of nominations was reported in "Bourne Union", Grantham Journal, 8 December 1894, p. 6.

Aftermath 
The first meeting of the newly elected council was held on 3 January 1895 and all but three members – Robert Agnew (Bourne), A. W. Dean (Dowsby) and D. J. Millington (Sempringham) – were present. Captain E. Smith (Horbling) acted as temporary chairman and the clerk read out instructions from the Local Government Board. The council then unanimously elected its first chairman, Thomas Pick, who was proposed by W. Hayes and seconded by J. Davenport-Handley. With Pick in the chair, the council then unanimously elected its first vice-chairman, W. Hayes, who was proposed by E. J. Grummitt and J. Worsdall.

References 

Elections in Lincolnshire